Manuel Piñero Sánchez (born 1 September 1952) is a Spanish professional golfer.

Piñero was born in Badajoz. He turned professional in 1968 and established himself on the European Tour in the early 1970s. He won nine titles on the Tour, the most prestigious of them the 1977 British PGA Championship. He featured in the top ten on the European Tour Order of Merit five times, including back to back fourth places in 1976 and 1977.

Piñero was with Bing Crosby when Crosby died. On 14 October 1977, Piñero teamed up with Crosby in a recreational match against fellow Spanish pro Valentín Barrios and his amateur partner Cesar de Zulueta, owner of Moraleja Golf Course, where the match was played. Shortly after the match ended Crosby had a heart attack at the edge of the clubhouse and died instantaneously.

Piñero played for Europe in two Ryder Cups. In 1981 he defeated Jerry Pate 2 & 1 in his singles match. In 1985 he claimed four points out of five for the team which captured the trophy from the United States for the first time since 1957, defeating Lanny Wadkins 3 & 1 in singles. He was also a member of Spain's two man team at the World Cup of Golf nine times, collecting the team title in 1976 and 1982. On the latter occasion he also won the individual title.

Since turning fifty in 2002 Piñero has played on the European Seniors Tour, but he has had little success at that level.

Professional wins (18)

European Tour wins (9)

European Tour playoff record (3–0)

Other wins (8)
1973 Spanish Professional Closed Championship
1974 Spanish Professional Closed Championship
1976 World Cup (with Seve Ballesteros)
1982 World Cup (with José María Cañizares)
1982 World Cup Individual Trophy
1983 Spanish Professional Closed Championship
1984 Spanish Professional Closed Championship
1989 Spanish Professional Closed Championship

Other senior wins (1)
2003 Spanish Seniors Professional Closed Championship

Results in major championships

Note: Piñero never played in the  U.S. Open.

CUT = missed the half-way cut (3rd round cut in 1978 Open Championship)
"T" indicates a tie for a place

Team appearances
Double Diamond International (representing Continental Europe): 1974, 1976 (captain)
World Cup (representing Spain): 1974, 1976 (winners), 1978, 1979, 1980, 1982 (winners, individual winner), 1983, 1985, 1988
Philip Morris International (representing Spain): 1975
Hennessy Cognac Cup (representing the Continent of Europe): 1976, 1978, 1980, 1982
Ryder Cup (representing Europe): 1981, 1985 (winners)
Dunhill Cup (representing Spain): 1985

See also
List of golfers with most European Tour wins

References

External links

Spanish male golfers
European Tour golfers
European Senior Tour golfers
Ryder Cup competitors for Europe
Sportspeople from Badajoz
Sportspeople from Málaga
1952 births
Living people
20th-century Spanish people
21st-century Spanish people